Pogonocherus mixtus is a species of beetle in the family Cerambycidae. It was described by Haldeman in 1847. It is known from Canada and the United States.

References

Pogonocherini
Beetles described in 1847